Trabzon 19 Mayıs Arena is an indoor basketball venue located in Trabzon, Turkey.

Built in 1951, the venue hosted the 2007 Black Sea Games. Following renovation works in 2010, basketball matches for girls were played at this arena during the 2011 European Youth Summer Olympic Festival.

The arena is home to the basketball teams of the clubs Trabzonspor Basketball, Trabzon İdmanocağı and Trabzon Belediyesi S.K.

References

Sports venues in Trabzon
Sports venues completed in 1951
Basketball venues in Turkey